"Beautiful Ones" is the second single from the album Coming Up (1996) by Suede, released on 14 October 1996 through Nude Records. The song became a top-ten hit in the United Kingdom, peaking at number eight, and reached number one in Iceland for two weeks.

Background
Featuring one of new guitarist Richard Oakes' first guitar riffs, "Beautiful Ones" became one of Suede's more popular singles. The song was originally titled "Dead Leg" after bassist Mat Osman threatened to give Oakes a dead leg if he was unable to write a top ten single. The song charted at number eight on the UK Singles Chart in October 1996, in an era when the top 10 consisted of an eclectic mix of pop, indie and dance music.

The video for the song was directed by Pedro Romhanyi, who had previously made the video for the band's third single, "Animal Nitrate" in early 1993. The video features the band shot in black and white performing the song, intercut with quick edits of conceptual segments illustrating the song's lyrics in a literal fashion.

Critical reception
Larry Flick from Billboard wrote that "like a fast-mangled Oasis song, The London Suede succeeded in making sounds of pop/rock that are definitely unique. The painfully true lyrics and vibrant sounds have already proved to be a hit in the U.K." Music writer James Masterton said in his weekly UK chart commentary, that the band’s follow up to "Trash" "hits similar heights with a rather fine catchy melody that is by no means instant but gradually works its way into your consciousness with repeated listens." A reviewer from Music Week rated it four out of five, adding that "the familiar strains of Brett Anderson ride over this strong single".

In 2014, Paste listed the song at number 34 in its list of "The 50 Best Britpop Songs". Michael Danaher wrote: "The song is both simple and sophisticated, and it's a true Britpop gem that deserves much attention."

Track listings
All songs were written by Brett Anderson and Richard Oakes except where noted.

UK CD1
 "Beautiful Ones"
 "Young Men"
 "Sound of the Streets" 

UK CD2
 "Beautiful Ones"
 "Money"
 "Sam" 

UK cassette single
 "Beautiful Ones"
 "By the Sea" (original demo) 

European CD single
 "Beautiful Ones"
 "Young Men"

Japanese CD single
 "Beautiful Ones"
 "Sound of the Streets" 
 "Money"
 "Sam"

Charts

Weekly charts

Year-end charts

Certifications

References

Suede (band) songs
1996 singles
1996 songs
Music videos directed by Pedro Romhanyi
Number-one singles in Iceland
Song recordings produced by Ed Buller
Songs written by Brett Anderson
Songs written by Richard Oakes (guitarist)